Squidbillies is an American adult animated television series created by Jim Fortier and Dave Willis for Cartoon Network's late night programming block, Adult Swim. An unofficial pilot for the series aired on April 1, 2005. The series later made its official debut on October 16, 2005 and ended on December 13, 2021, with a total of 132 episodes over the course of 13 seasons. 

The series is about the Cuyler family, an impoverished family of anthropomorphic hillbilly mud squids living in the Georgia region of the Blue Ridge Mountains. The series revolves around the exploits of an alcoholic father (Early), who is often abusive in a comedic way towards his family. His teenage son, Rusty, is desperate for his approval; his mother and grandmother, known in the show as Granny, is often the center of his aggression; and Lil, Early's sister, is mostly unconscious in a pool of her own vomit.

Series overview

Episodes

Season 1 (2005)

Season 2 (2006)

Season 3 (2008)

Season 4 (2009)

Season 5 (2010)

Season 6 (2011)

Season 7 (2012)

Season 8 (2013)

Season 9 (2014)

Season 10 (2016)

Season 11 (2017)

Season 12 (2019)

Season 13 (2021)

References

External links
 
 
 

Lists of American adult animated television series episodes
Lists of American comedy television series episodes